Fabian Dominic Ribauw (born January 18, 1971) is a political figure from the Pacific nation of Nauru.

Background and political role

Ribauw was born in Baitsi. He studied in Australia and earned a BA in Economics from La Trobe University, Melbourne.

Ribauw served a period as a Member of the Parliament of Nauru. He was the Speaker of the Parliament of Nauru from 29 May 2003 to 8 August 2003.

Loss of Parliamentary seat

In the elections held in April 2008, Ribauw lost his seat in the Parliament of Nauru.

References

See also
 Politics of Nauru
 2008 Nauruan parliamentary election

1971 births
Living people
Speakers of the Parliament of Nauru
21st-century Nauruan politicians